The 1955 BYU Cougars football team was an American football team that represented Brigham Young University (BYU) as a member of the Skyline Conference during the 1955 college football season. In their seventh and final season under head coach Chick Atkinson, the Cougars compiled an overall record of 1–9 with a mark of 0–7 against conference opponents, finished last out of eight teams in the Skyline, and were outscored by a total of 300 to 104.

The team's statistical leaders included Don Dixon with 335 passing yards, Phil Oyler with 366 rushing yards and 381 yards of total offense, Owen Skousen with 190 receiving yards, and LeGrand Young with 19 points scored.

Schedule

References

BYU
BYU Cougars football seasons
BYU Cougars football